The 1964 Washington Huskies football team was an American football team that represented the University of Washington during the 1964 NCAA University Division football season.  In its eighth season under head coach Jim Owens, the team compiled a 6–4 record, finished third in the Athletic Association of Western Universities, and outscored its opponents 139 to 110. Charlie Browning and Rick Redman were the team captains.

Schedule

Game summaries

Washington State

Source:

All-Coast

Professional football draft selections
Four University of Washington Huskies were selected in the 1965 NFL Draft, which lasted twenty rounds with 280 selections. Two of those Huskies were also selected in the 1965 AFL Draft, which lasted twenty rounds with 160 selections.

References

External links
 Game program: Washington vs. Washington State at Spokane – November 21, 1964

Washington
Washington Huskies football seasons
Washington Huskies football